John Jacob Bogert House is located in Harrington Park, Bergen County, New Jersey, United States. The house was built in 1830 and was added to the National Register of Historic Places on November 26, 2004.

See also
National Register of Historic Places listings in Bergen County, New Jersey

References

Georgian architecture in New Jersey
Harrington Park, New Jersey
Houses on the National Register of Historic Places in New Jersey
Houses completed in 1830
Houses in Bergen County, New Jersey
National Register of Historic Places in Bergen County, New Jersey
1830 establishments in New Jersey
New Jersey Register of Historic Places